Karen Bennett (born 5 February 1989) is a British rower who competed both the 2016 Summer Olympics and 2020 Summer Olympics.

Rowing career
Bennett's hometown is Edinburgh in Scotland. and she rows for the Leander Club. She was a member of the Scotland Team at the 2014 Commonwealth Rowing Championships.

She was part of the British team that topped the medal table at the 2015 World Rowing Championships at Lac d'Aiguebelette in France, where she won a silver medal as part of the coxless four with Rebecca Chin, Lucinda Gooderham and Holly Norton.

She won a silver medal in the women's eight at the 2016 Olympic Games.

In 2021, she won a European bronze medal in the coxless four in Varese, Italy.

References

External links 
 
 Karen Bennett at British Rowing
 Karen Bennett wins GB Trials and made Glasgow 2018 rowing ambassador
 
 

1989 births
Living people
sportspeople from Edinburgh
British female rowers
Scottish female rowers
Rowers at the 2016 Summer Olympics
Olympic rowers of Great Britain
Olympic silver medallists for Great Britain
Medalists at the 2016 Summer Olympics
Rowers at the 2020 Summer Olympics
Olympic medalists in rowing
World Rowing Championships medalists for Great Britain
Scottish Olympic medallists